KHFX (1140 kHz) is a commercial AM radio station licensed to Cleburne, Texas, and serving the Dallas/Fort Worth Metroplex.  It carries a Spanish language Christian radio format and is owned by the Siga Broadcasting Corporation.  It calls itself "Radio Pentecostes Cristo Vive 1140" or "Radio Pentecostal Christ Lives."

By day, KHFX is powered at 5,000 watts.  But 1140 AM is a clear channel frequency reserved for Class A stations XEMR Monterrey, Mexico, and WRVA Richmond, Virginia.  So KHFX reduces its power at night to 710 watts to avoid interference.  It uses a directional antenna at all times.  The daytime signal covers the southern section of the Metroplex.  The nighttime signal covers a small area mostly south of Fort Worth.

History 

As "KCLE" until the end of August 2008, it had aired a country music radio format since 1947, despite some changes.  The callsign swap with 1460 took place on September 1.

Sometime in the first half of 2008, it increased daytime power to 5,000 watts to cover the southern half of the Dallas/Fort Worth area as well as Corsicana and Waxahachie, Texas.

In February 2009 the station was operated via a local marketing agreement by RV Ministries Inc. under the name Radio Vida "La Voz del Evangelio", with transmission time of 12 hours. "Radio Vida" also broadcasts on 89.9 FM in Cooper, Texas.

In August 2011, it switched from its former Spanish language programming to become a 24-hour, all-talk affiliate of the Republic Broadcasting Network.

KGBC's Texas sister stations with SIGA Broadcasting include KTMR (1130 AM, Converse), KLVL (1480 AM, Pasadena), KGBC (1540 AM, Galveston), KAML (990 AM, Kenedy-Karnes City), and KFJZ (870 AM, Fort Worth).

References

External links
Official website

 DFW Radio/TV History

Radio stations established in 1947
HFX
News and talk radio stations in the United States
1947 establishments in Texas